Lemon Sky Studios is a computer-generated imagery studio that produces art for animation and video game titles, based in Kuala Lumpur, Malaysia. The company is best known for outsourcing computer animation and art project for major video game titles such as Final Fantasy VII Remake, Resident Evil: Resistance, Warcraft III: Reforged, StarCraft: Remastered, Uncharted: The Lost Legacy, Marvel's Spider-Man, and Gears of War 5. The studio also involved in animation series such as TruckTown and Nickelodeon's Middle School Moguls.

Organization
Lemon Sky's production team is made up of over 450 artists and production staff.

The studio's headquarters is located in Kuala Lumpur, Malaysia, with an additional branch located in the city of Penang.

The studio's founders, Cheng-Fei Wong and Ken Foong, currently act as the Chief Executive Officer and Chief Creative Officer of the studio respectively.

Video game projects

Animation projects

Controversies
In March 2021, game journalist Chris Bratt from People Make Games interviewed 19 current and former employee from Lemon Sky Studios and Indonesia-based animation studio Brandoville regarding working conditions. The testimonial from employees revealed that Lemon Sky Studios allegedly put its artists through unpaid overtime and had them work weekends to meet tight deadlines from triple-A clients. The higher-ups allegedly used passive-aggressive methods to pressure Lemon Sky artists to work overtime. Lemon Sky Studios denied the allegations as "factually and legally inaccurate" and "are surprised that such allegations are targeted at Lemon Sky", stating they abide all Malaysian employment laws. Lemon Sky Studios also stated they will "take appropriate measures in response", include "obtaining feedback from all of our employees regarding their individual concerns".

References

Malaysian animation studios
Video game development companies
Mass media companies established in 2006